Rival Choir, formerly known as Mouth of the South, was an American Christian post-hardcore and metalcore band from Denton, Texas formed in 2007. The band signed with Facedown Records in January 2014. Struggle Well was the band's last album under the name Mouth of the South. After announcing their change from Mouth of the South to Rival Choir, their new album—I Believe, Help My Unbelief—was released on February 5, 2016, also by Facedown Records. On November 18, the band released the debut single from the new album, entitled "Aftermath".

Members
Current
Juan Pardo - vocals
Christian Prince - guitar
Daniel Mackey - guitar
Colton Bartholet - bass
Garrett Metzger - drums

Former
Mike Butler - guitar
Tanner Allen - guitar
Kane Taliaferro - drums
Josh Davis - drums
Alex Knight - bass
Will Fordyce - guitar
Luke Andrews - vocals
Josiah Lyle - vocals
Justin Davis - vocals

Discography
Studio albums

EPs
 Manifestations (2009, Independent)
 Of Dust (2012, Independent)

References

Facedown Records artists
Musical groups established in 2007
Musical groups disestablished in 2018
Metalcore musical groups